Parker Brothers (known by Parker outside of North America) was an American toy and game manufacturer which in 1991 became a brand of Hasbro. More than 1,800 games were published under the Parker Brothers name since 1883. Among its products were Monopoly, Clue (licensed from the British publisher and known as Cluedo outside of North America), Sorry!, Risk, Trivial Pursuit, Ouija, Aggravation, Bop It, Scrabble (under a joint partnership with Milton Bradley in North America and Canada), and Probe. The trade name became defunct with former products being marketed under the "Hasbro Gaming" label with the logo shown on Monopoly games.

History

Parker Brothers was founded by George Swinnerton Parker. Parker's philosophy deviated from the prevalent theme of board game design; he believed that games should be played for enjoyment and did not need to emphasize morals and values. He created his first game, called Banking, in 1883 when he was 16. Banking is a game in which players borrow money from the bank and try to generate wealth by guessing how well they could do. The game includes 160 cards which foretell their failure or success. The game was so popular among family and friends that his brother, Charles Parker, urged him to publish it. George approached two Boston publishers with the idea, but was unsuccessful. Not discouraged, he spent $40 to publish 500 sets of Banking. He eventually sold all but twelve copies, making a profit of $100.

Parker founded his game company, initially called the George S. Parker Company, in his hometown of Salem, Massachusetts in 1883. When George's brother Charles joined the business in 1888, the company's name was changed to its more familiar form. In 1898 a third brother, Edward H. Parker, joined the company. For many years, George designed most of the games himself, and wrote all the rules. Many games were based on important events of the day: Klondike was based on the Klondike Gold Rush, and War in Cuba was based on the impending Spanish–American War.

The game industry was growing, and the company was becoming very profitable. In 1906, Parker Brothers published the game Rook and it became the bestselling game in the country. During the Great Depression, a time when many companies went out of business, Parker Brothers released a new board game called Monopoly. Although the company had originally rejected the game in 1934, they decided to publish it the next year. It was a success, and the company had difficulty keeping up with demand. The company continued to grow throughout the next several decades, producing games including Cluedo (released as Clue in North America), Risk, and Sorry!

Parker Brothers marketed its first jigsaw puzzle in 1887. Parker also produced children's puzzles, as well as the Climax, Jig-A-Jig, Jig Wood, and Paramount lines. According to Jigsaw Puzzles: An Illustrated History and Price Guide, by Anne D. Williams, Parker Bros. closed the Pastime line in the 1950s and their die-cut puzzles were phased out in the late 1970s.

Even after George Parker's death, the company remained family-owned until 1968 when General Mills purchased the company. After this, Parker Brothers produced the first Nerf ball. In the UK during the 1970s, Parker Brothers was the games division of Palitoy (also a General Mills company), and produced a variety of releases such as Escape from Colditz. In 1977, the company built its headquarters in Beverly, Massachusetts.

The company began to produce electronic versions of their popular board games in the late 1970s and early 1980s. At this time, the company ventured into the toy market with the electronic action figure, Rom the Spaceknight, in 1979. Although the toy proved a failure, the licensed comic book published by Marvel Comics ran for years after the toy was discontinued. They also produced video games for various systems during the early 1980s, with home ports of many popular arcade games such as Konami's Frogger, Nintendo's Popeye, Gottlieb games such as Q*bert and Reactor, and the first video games based on the Star Wars films such as The Empire Strikes Back, Jedi Arena, Death Star Battle, and more.

In early 1983, Parker Brothers spent US$15 million establishing a book publishing branch; their first titles featured the American Greetings franchises, Care Bears and Strawberry Shortcake. The branch published twelve titles by February 1984; sales of these books totaled 3.5 million units. Parker Brothers also operated a record label around the same time; one of its releases, based on Coleco's Cabbage Patch Kids and involving Tom and Stephen Chapin titled Cabbage Patch Dreams, was certified Gold by the Recording Industry Association of America (RIAA) in July 1984.

In 1985, General Mills merged the company with their subsidiary Kenner; this new company, Kenner Parker Toys Inc., was acquired by Tonka in 1987. In 1988, Parker Brothers struck a deal with Martindale/Gilden Productions to develop television game shows, such as Boggle.

Tonka, including Parker Brothers, was bought in 1991 for about $516 million by Hasbro which also owned the Milton Bradley Company. Following the acquisition, Parker Brothers continued to have its corporate offices in Beverly, but production of the games were moved to Milton Bradley's headquarters in East Longmeadow. In 1998, Parker Brothers and Milton Bradley were consolidated at the new Hasbro Games campus (based in the former address of Parker Brothers' headquarters) to merge together and form Hasbro Games. Milton Bradley and Parker Bros subsequently turned into two separate brands of Hasbro before being retired in 2009 in favor of the Hasbro brand.

See also

 Cluedo
 Monopoly
 My Monopoly
 Probe
 Risk
 Scrabble 
 Waddingtons

References

Further reading
 From Hostility to Reverence: 100 Years of African-American Imagery in Games
 Don Kader, "Collecting Black Memorabilia", Collectors' Showcase (September/October 1982), 16.

External links 
 The Game Makers, a book by Philip Orbanes, chronicles the history of Parker Brothers
 Parker Brothers on the History Channel
 The story of Parker's early games
 New York Historical Society owns many examples of Parker Bros. games, such as:
 The Good Old Game of Corner Grocery, 1887
 Chivalry: The Greatest Modern Board Game of Skill
 Round the World Joe
 Young People's Geographical Game. Salem, MA: Parker Bros., ca. 1890
 Parker Brothers game listings and information in the Association for Games & Puzzles International's Game Catalog
 Parker Brothers game listings and information at BoardGameGeek

 
1883 establishments in Massachusetts
American companies established in 1883
Board game publishing companies
Companies based in Essex County, Massachusetts
Manufacturing companies established in 1883
Game manufacturers
Toy companies of the United States
Former Hasbro subsidiaries
History of Salem, Massachusetts
1968 mergers and acquisitions
1985 mergers and acquisitions
1987 mergers and acquisitions